31 Crateris is a binary star system in the constellation Corvus. Varying between apparent magnitudes 5.19 and 5.23 over 1.48 days, it has the variable star designation of TY Corvi. It is actually a remote system with a hot blue-white star of spectral type B1.5V and a companion about which little is known. The two stars orbit each other every 2.9631 days. The primary is possibly a blue straggler of the Hyades group. The primary is around 15.5 times as massive as the Sun and 52,262 times as luminous.

British astronomer John Flamsteed numbered the stars in an expanded constellation he termed Hydra and Crater, which included the stars of Hydra immediately below the Cup. Published in 1712, this was not followed by later astronomers. 31 Crateris ended up in the constellation Corvus after formal boundaries were set in 1922.

On 27 March 1974, the Mariner 10 mission detected emissions in the far ultraviolet. These were initially thought to be Mercury's moon before the source was shown to be 31 Crateris.

References

B-type main-sequence stars
Blue stragglers
Crateris, 31
104337
058587
Corvus (constellation)
4590
Durchmusterung objects
Spectroscopic binaries
Mariner program